Alexander Clarke may refer to:
 Alexander Ross Clarke, British geodesist
 Alexander Clarke (cricketer), Guyanese cricketer

See also
 Alex Clarke (disambiguation)
 Alexander Clark (disambiguation)